Kinase D-interacting substrate of 220 kDa or ARMS (ankyrin repeat-rich membrane spanning) is a scaffold protein that in humans is encoded by the KIDINS220 gene.

It is a downstream target of neuronal signaling events initiated by neutrophins and ephrins. Additionally, it was shown to have important roles in the immune system by interacting with the B-cell and T-cell receptor.

Molecular biology

The gene is located on the short arm of chromosome 2 (2p25.1) on the Crick strand. It is 116,550 bases in length. It encodes a transmembrane protein that is preferentially expressed in the nervous system. The protein acts as a receptor for the CRKL-C3G complex. Binding this complex results in Rap1-dependent sustained ERK activation. This, in turn, interacts with several pathways the effects of which are under active investigation.

Clinical importance

Heterozygous mutations of this gene have been suggested as a cause of a syndrome consisting of spastic paraplegia, intellectual disability, nystagmus and obesity. Knock out mice with homozygous mutations have non-viable offspring with enlarged cerebral ventricles. A consanginous couple has been reported who suffered from repeated miscarriages in whom homozygous mutations of this gene were found. Post mortem showed enlarged cerebral ventricles and contracted limbs.

References

Further reading